Cowell Airport  is an airport located  northwest of Cowell, in the Eyre Peninsula region of South Australia. The primary runway, 04/22 is equipped with runway lights to facilitate night operations. While there are no terminal facilities at the airport, a public telephone and toilet block are available.

See also
 List of airports in South Australia

References

Airports in South Australia
Eyre Peninsula